Rora is a rural settlement in the Buchan area of Aberdeenshire, Scotland, situated  north-west of Peterhead and lying to the north of the River Ugie.

Rora Moss
Rora Moss, a Site of Special Scientific Interest, is an area of raised peat bog lying to the north-west of the village. The area has been heavily drained and subject to domestic and commercial peat cutting.

People from Rora
Thomas Arbuthnot (Senior), pioneer of commercial kelp manufacture (1681–1762)
Charles Arbuthnot, abbot and mathematician (1737–1820)

References

Villages in Aberdeenshire
Sites of Special Scientific Interest in Banff and Buchan